Ildobates neboti is a species of beetle in the family Carabidae, the only species in the genus Ildobates.

References

Dryptinae